Thomas John Rowe (born May 23, 1956) is an American ice hockey executive, former player and coach.

Career
Selected by the Washington Capitals in the 1976 NHL Entry Draft, Rowe also played for the Hartford Whalers and Detroit Red Wings. He was also a member of the United States national team at the 1977 Ice Hockey World Championships. Rowe was the first American-born player to score 30 or more goals in an NHL season. He accomplished this feat in the 1978–79 season with the Washington Capitals. That season he scored 31 goals in 69 games.

Rowe was an assistant coach for the Carolina Hurricanes of the National Hockey League from 2008 until 2011. Rowe previously coached the Albany River Rats and Lowell Lock Monsters. He won a Stanley Cup championship with the Carolina Hurricanes in 2006.

On April 9, 2012, Rowe was announced as the new head coach of hockey club Lokomotiv Yaroslavl.

On November 9, 2013, Rowe was announced as the new head coach of the San Antonio Rampage, the AHL farm team for the Florida Panthers. In 2015, when the Panthers relocated their AHL affiliation to Portland, Maine, Rowe became head coach of the Portland Pirates. During his first season with the Pirates, Rowe left the club mid-season when he was promoted by the Panthers to take up a position as the associate general manager on January 1, 2016. On November 27, 2016, Rowe fired head coach Gerard Gallant and took over as head coach.

On April 10, 2017, Rowe was demoted from his role as head coach and general manager but stayed with the Panthers organization as an advisor to president and general manager Dale Tallon.

Career statistics

Regular season and playoffs

International

Head coaching record

References

External links

Profile at hockeydraftcentral.com

1956 births
Living people
Adirondack Red Wings players
American men's ice hockey right wingers
Binghamton Whalers players
Carolina Hurricanes coaches
Carolina Hurricanes scouts
Detroit Red Wings players
Florida Panthers coaches
Florida Panthers general managers
Hartford Whalers announcers
Hartford Whalers executives
Hartford Whalers players
Hartford Whalers scouts
Hershey Bears players
Ice hockey people from Massachusetts
London Knights players
Lowell Lock Monsters
Moncton Alpines (AHL) players
Sportspeople from Lynn, Massachusetts
Springfield Indians players
Stanley Cup champions
Washington Capitals draft picks
Washington Capitals players
Winnipeg Jets (WHA) draft picks
Ice hockey coaches from Massachusetts
Ice hockey players from Massachusetts